Acanthotretella is a genus of brachiopods known from the Burgess Shale and the Guanshan fauna.

Their spines are proposed to be homologous with those of the Siphonotretids.

Species
 Acanthotretella decaius Hu, Zhang, Holmer & Skovsted, 2010
 Acanthotretella spinosa Holmer & Caron, 2006

References

Prehistoric brachiopod genera
Fossil taxa described in 2006
Lingulata